Pagani Automobili S.p.A. (commonly referred to as Pagani) is an Italian  manufacturer of hypercars and carbon fiber components. The company was founded in 1992 by the Argentine Horacio Pagani and is based in San Cesario sul Panaro, near Modena, Italy.

History 
Horacio Pagani, who formerly managed Lamborghini's composites department, founded Pagani Composite Research in 1988. This new company worked with Lamborghini on numerous projects, including the restyling of the Lamborghini Countach 25th Anniversary Edition, the Lamborghini LM002, the P140 design concept, and the Diablo. In the late 1980s, Pagani began designing his own car, then referred to as the "C8 Project". Pagani planned to rename the C8 the "Fangio F1" to honour his friend, the Argentinian five-time Formula One champion, Juan Manuel Fangio.

In 1991, Pagani established Modena Design to meet the increasing demand for his design, engineering, and prototyping services. In 1992, he began construction of a Fangio F1 prototype, and by 1993, the car was being tested at the Dallara wind tunnel with positive results. In 1994, Mercedes-Benz agreed to supply Pagani with V12 engines. The cost of these cars are at a total of 2.3 million dollars.

The final car was named the Zonda C12, the first of the Zonda line (the Fangio F1 name was dropped out of respect for Fangio, who died in 1995). It was first presented at the 1999 Geneva Motor Show.

In 2005, Pagani announced that it planned to triple its production output within the next three years, and to enter the US market in 2007.

On 30 June 2010, Pagani claimed a new record for production-based cars using the Pagani Zonda R and completing the Nürburgring in 6:47, beating the Ferrari 599XX.

Pagani Zonda 

Pagani's first model, the Zonda, is powered by a mid-mounted DOHC V12 engine manufactured by Mercedes-Benz's AMG division. The car's design was inspired by jet fighters and the famous Sauber-Mercedes Silver Arrow Group C cars, and features several unique design elements, including its circular four pipe exhaust system.

The Zonda's production run ended with the Zonda HP Barchetta. Only three were produced with one unit retained for Horacio Pagani's personal collection and the other two costing US$15M.

 Zonda
 C12 
 C12 S 
 C12 S 
 C12 S Roadster
 GR (racing car)
 Zonda F
 Zonda Roadster F
 Zonda F Clubsport
 Zonda Roadster F Clubsport

Zonda Cinque 
Pagani announced a variant of the Zonda named "Zonda Cinque" which was introduced as a 2009 model. The Cinque is based on the track-only Zonda R, but features a new  Mercedes-Benz M297 V12 engine, active aerodynamics, and features exterior elements from the newly developed material "carbon-titanium fibre", which is stronger and lighter than typical carbon fibre. Only five were produced, all of which were already spoken for.

Pagani announced the Zonda Cinque Roadster in July 2009, of which only five were produced. The roadster uses the same Mercedes-Benz M297 V12 engine as the coupé version, but has been made lighter and stronger to keep the car structurally rigid. The Cinque uses carbon-ceramic brakes from Brembo. They help decelerate the car from –0 mph in 3.1 seconds and –0mph in 4.3 seconds. The maximum side acceleration is 1.45g with road tyres.

Zonda Tricolore 
At the 2010 Geneva Motor Show, Pagani announced the exclusive Zonda Tricolore, built to commemorate the 50th anniversary of the Frecce Tricolori, the Italian Air Force's aerobatic squadron. Originally intended to be limited to a single car, eventually three were produced. The Tricolore is based on a top specification Zonda Cinque, built on a carbon titanium chassis with sequential transmission and titanium exhausts.

Other production variants 
 Zonda R
 Zonda Revolucion
 Zonda HP Barchetta

Bespoke editions 
 2004 C12 S Monza (a track day car based on the GR) – commissioned by King Moka
 2009 Zonda PS (originally white with golden contrast) – commissioned by Peter Saywell
 2009 Zonda GJ (bare carbon)
 2010 Zonda Uno (turquoise)
 2011 Zonda HH (sky blue) - commissioned by programmer David Heinemeier Hansson
 2011 Zonda 750 (bare carbon fibre with pink accents)
 2011 Zonda Rak (yellow)
 2011 Zonda Absolute (matte black)
 2011 Zonda 760RS (carbon fibre black)
 2012 Zonda 760LH (Purple) – commissioned by F1 driver Lewis Hamilton
 2012 Zonda 764 Passione (Grey/Purple)
 2015 Zonda 760 X
 2016 Zonda 760 OLIVER Evolution 
 2017 Zonda Fantasma Evo (red tinted carbon with Italian flag striping in the centre along with bare carbon on the centre)
 2018 Zonda Riviera (Snow white with bare carbon in the centre and blue accents).

Pagani Huayra 

The Pagani Huayra, a successor to the Pagani Zonda, was initially revealed online in a press release on January 25, 2011. It was officially revealed at the 2011 Geneva Motor Show. The car is named after the Incan god of wind, Huayra-tata. The Huayra's  body is made from carbotanium; a lightweight composition of carbon fibre and titanium. The Huayra has been redesigned from the ground up, but shares many visual qualities with its predecessor. Only 100 units of the Huayra were produced, each costing £1,000,000 without options.

Official technical data 
 Engine: 6.0 L Mercedes-AMG M158 twin-turbo V12
 Displacement: 
 Power:  at 5800 rpm
 Torque:  at 2250–4500 rpm
 Transmission: 7-speed sequential manual with AMT robotic system including driving modes
 Length: 
 Wheelbase: 
 Height: 
 Width: 
 Dry weight: 
 Weight distribution: 44% front 56% rear
 Drag Coefficient: .31 to .36 (variable).

Huayra BC 

An extreme, track-focused version of the Huayra called the Huayra BC was unveiled at the 2016 Geneva Motor Show. The Huayra BC is named after the late Benny Caiola, a friend of Horacio Pagani, and the first Pagani customer. The Huayra BC uses a lightweight titanium exhaust system, new aluminum alloy wheels, and a stripped-out interior. The tyres are Pirelli P-Zero Corsa tires that feature 12 different rubber compounds, and the suspension and wishbones are made of aeronautical grade aluminum, known as Avional. The Huayra BC also has a new front bumper with a front splitter and winglets, deeper side skirts, and an air diffuser that stretches the entire width of the rear bumper along with a large rear wing. The car uses an Xtrac 7-speed sequential manual transmission and has an electro-hydraulic actuation system. Pagani has stuck with a single-clutch gearbox because it weighs 40% less than double-clutch gearboxes.

30 units of the Huayra BC were made, despite the claim by Pagani that the model was limited to 20 units. Each unit cost in excess of €2.1M.

Later, Pagani unveiled the Huayra Roadster BC and produced 40 units.

Huayra Roadster 
After 2 years of development, the Huayra Roadster was officially unveiled in the 2017 Geneva Motor Show. 

The design of the car underwent several changes, with the most noticeable being the rear, with updated eyelid-like fixed flaps that continued with the design and eventually ended on the rear lights. Vents were included on the rear engine cover for efficient cooling of the engine, and the wheels were updated specifically for the car along with Pirelli P-Zero tires, along with the addition of a spoiler at the front. The car has conventional doors instead of the Gull-wing doors used in the coupé as such doors cannot be fitted to an open top car. The power is delivered to the rear wheels via a Xtrac 7-speed sequential manual transmission which is 40% lighter than its coupé counterpart. The car was constructed by a material developed by Pagani called 'carbon triax', which is a combination of tri-axis fibre glass with carbon fibre. Only 100 were made, all of which were sold even before production ended. 

Pagani said that the car could accelerate at 1.8 G.

Bespoke editions 
Continuing its tradition with the Zonda, Pagani produced several bespoke Huayras.
 Huayra Carbon Edition (bare carbon exterior)
 Huayra White Edition (Snow white exterior with carbon fibre bits)
 Huayra La Monza Lisa (bare carbon exterior with tri-colore pinstriping, inspired by the Zonda R) – commissioned by Kris Singh
 Huayra 730 S "Da Vinci" (tinted blue carbon exterior with gold accents and wheels, inspired by the Zonda tri-colore) – originally commissioned by Alejandro Salomon
 Huayra BC Kingtasma (tinted red carbon exterior with tri-colore pinstriping and gold crowns beneath the two rear flaps featuring a roof scoop)
 Huayra Pearl (tinted blue carbon exterior with a split rear wing inspired by the Zonda C12 and a roof scoop inspired by the Zonda Cinque)
 Huayra Dinastia (three special edition bespoke cars produced for the Chinese market inspired by Chinese traditions)
 Huayra II Ultimo (final Pagani Huayra coupé featuring the optional pacchetto tempesta aero package along with a bespoke roof scoop and rear wing with a paint job inspired by Formula One driver Lewis Hamilton's F1 car)
 Huayra Hermes Edition (a 1 of 1 custom Coach-Built Pagani Huayra with interior/exterior detailing by Hermes. The car is owned and was partly customised by Iranian-American entrepreneur; Manny Khoshbin)
 Huayra Pieagoni TPG (black and white carbon exterior) commissioned by a Dallas based watch dealer and car collector.
 Huayra Codalunga  (a 1 of 5 longtail version of the Huayra)

Pagani Utopia 

The successor to the Huayra, named Utopia, was revealed on September 12, 2022. It has a planned production run of 99 units of the coupé variant, though Pagani have not disclosed the price or when deliveries will begin.

See also 

 List of Italian companies

References

Bibliography

External links 

"Pagani factory home to handcrafted power" - Review of the Pagani factory tour

 
Sports car manufacturers
Car brands
Vehicle manufacturing companies established in 1992
Italian brands
Italian  companies established in 1992
Companies based in the Province of Modena